

The Little River is a minor river in the Florida Big Bend.

Forming at the confluence of Attapulgus Creek and Willacoochee Creek which drain part of southwestern Georgia, the river flows south through Gadsden County east of Quincy, draining part of the Red Hills before entering Lake Talquin State Park before reaching its terminus, flowing into Lake Talquin, a reservoir on the Ochlockonee River.

The river flows through Little River Conservation Area, a  tract purchased by the State of Florida using Florida Forever funds for the protection of wildlife habitat and floodplain forest along the middle river.

Recreation and Wildlife
The Little River, although not a designated canoe trail, is often used by canoeists, especially on the lower river. The forests surrounding the river are also popular for hunting, while bream and pickerel provide fishing opportunities.

Birch, pine, red cedar and willows can be found lining the riverbanks, while damselflies, snapping turtles and other wildlife are also present.

1969 Flood
A tropical disturbance that moved inland from the Gulf of Mexico on 20 September 1969 produced heavy rainfalls, exceeding , over part of Gadsden County between the 20th and 23rd of that month, including  at Quincy during six hours on 21 September. Between 6a.m. 21 September and 6a.m. 22 September, the river level rose , with the river's discharge exceeding that of a 50-year flood by a factor of 2.99, while at the US 90 bridge the westbound lanes were submerged under six inches (152 mm) of water.

List of crossings

References

 Northwest Florida Water Management District: Major Water Bodies

Rivers of Florida
Bodies of water of Gadsden County, Florida
Tributaries of the Ochlockonee River